Night Train to Surbiton was a 1965 British television thriller mini-series aired on the BBC. Cast included Peter Jones, Nicholas Parsons, Eleanor Summerfield, and Christine Finn. All six episodes are missing, believed lost.

References

External links
Night Train to Surbiton on IMDb

1965 British television series debuts
1965 British television series endings
Lost BBC episodes
English-language television shows
1960s British drama television series
1960s British television miniseries
Black-and-white British television shows
British thriller television series